"The Grandeur That Was Rome" is the tenth episode of the third series of the 1960s cult British spy-fi television series The Avengers, starring Patrick Macnee and Honor Blackman. It was first broadcast by ABC on 30 November 1963. The episode was directed by Kim Mills and written by Rex Edwards.

Plot
A megalomaniac food manufacturer who is obsessed with ancient Rome, is deliberately tainting his company's grain with ergot. Steed and Cathy are brought in to investigate.

Cast
 Patrick Macnee as John Steed
 Honor Blackman as Cathy Gale 
 Hugh Burden as Sir Bruno Luca 
 Colette Wilde as Octavia 
 John Flint as Marcus Dodds 
 Ian Shand as Eastow 
 Raymond Adamson as Lucius 
 Kenneth Keeling as Appleton 
 Colin Rix as Sergeant Barnes

References

External links

Episode overview on The Avengers Forever! website

The Avengers (season 3) episodes
1963 British television episodes